David I Anhoghin succeeded his father to the throne of the Kingdom of Tashir-Dzoraget. His nickname Anhoghin ("Landless") refers to a temporary loss of his lands he suffered after a defeat at the hands of the king of Ani.

Issue
 Kiurike II of Lori
 Gagik of Kakheti

References

Year of birth unknown
1048 deaths
David
David